Skyriver was a business broadband Internet provider headquartered in San Diego, California. It was acquired by One Ring Networks in July, 2018. Skyriver delivered broadband Internet connectivity for enterprise and small-medium businesses, utilizing its proprietary millimeter wave technology.  Skyriver offered commercial grade services including dedicated Internet access, Virtual Private Network (VPN), redundancy, and temporary Internet/event bandwidth in California.

History
Skyriver was founded in September 2000.
In March 2003 Skyriver formed the SkyWeb Alliance with two other regional providers in California.
Skyriver acquired California based internet service provider Terracom Network Services (TNS), closing the deal in March 2004.
In 2005 Skyriver acquired San Diego based IT outsourcing provider Integrate IT, Inc.  
In 2007 Skyriver  completed its backhaul upgrade in anticipation of its planned WiMAX rollout.
In 2007 Skyriver  added Orange County, California to its fixed wireless service area. 
Wireless broadband rates of 3 Mbps to 200 Mbps were marketed in Anaheim, La Habra, Garden Grove, Fullerton, Brea and Orange.
In 2008 Skyriver acquired the assets of Nethere, Inc.  In 2016, Skyriver announced the successful completion of prelaunch field trials for its new mmWave Gigabit broadband. In 2017, Skyriver commercially deployed 5G class Point to Multipoint (PTMP) millimeter wave (mmWave) broadband service for the business segment, leveraging millimeter wave spectrum the company had acquired previously and its patented technology for commercial grade enterprise broadband connectivity.

Services 
Skyriver offered dedicated, symmetrical commercial broadband Internet service and VPN, scalable up to 500 Mbps throughout Southern CA. Skyriver was a business ISP that did not provide residential services. Product suite includes: Skyriver Magnitude Broadband and VPN (mmWave); Skyriver Enterprise and Skyriver Pro (fixed wireless); Event/Hospitality Bandwidth; and temporary Internet for construction sites.

Skyriver used fixed wireless technology between mountain top and building top base stations to create a core network with a ring architecture with numerous gigabit connections to major data centers for Tier 1 peering to the Internet. For the core network, Skyriver utilized FCC licensed spectrum including 11 and 18 GHz for fixed wireless. Skyriver extended service from their core network to their customers via licensed millimeter wave spectrum  (39 GHz and 31 GHz).

Skyriver's network was wholly owned -  it did not lease or utilize any of the network architecture from major telecommunication providers.

See also 
Wireless network
Wireless Internet service provider
Fixed Wireless
Microwave broadband Internet
Millimeter wave (mmWave) broadband Internet

References

External links
Wimax Forum
Google Finance 
Hoovers
Skyriver and the Southern California Wildfires 2007
Skyriver homepage
TNS.net

Companies based in San Diego
Privately held companies based in California
Companies established in 2000
Internet service providers of the United States
Broadband